Mr. Mommaga is a 2016 Indian Kannada-language drama film directed by N. Ragavan and starring Rangayana Raghu, Ravi Gowda and Oviya. A remake of director's own Tamil film Manjapai (2014), it was released on 28 May 2016.

Cast
Rangayana Raghu
Ravi Gowda
Oviya
Avinash
Kuri Prathap
Bullet Prakash
M. N. Lakshmi Devi
Yuvina Parthavi
Satyajith
M. S. Umesh
Srinath Vasishta
Malavalli Saikrishna
Yathiraj

Soundtrack
The film's audio was released with at a ceremony in April 2016, with film industry personalities including Ganesh, Duniya Vijay, and Amulya sharing the stage with political attendees such as H. D. Kumaraswamy.

Reception
The film was released on 28 May 2016 across Karnataka. A critic from Times of India gave the film a positive review, noting that "this comic film is worth a watch, if you like a hearty dose of comedy with some little bit of weeps too". A reviewer from Chitratara noted "it is Rangayana Raghu variety of performances makes you to sit in the theatres and watch".

References

External links

2014 films
2010s Kannada-language films
Kannada remakes of Tamil films